A highball glass is a glass tumbler that can contain . It is used to serve highball cocktails and other mixed drinks.
A highball glass is taller than an Old Fashioned glass (lowball), and shorter and wider than a Collins glass.

References

External links

Drinking glasses
Drinkware